The Brantford Jail was a jail in downtown Brantford, Ontario. It was closed in December 2017. 

It was slated for closure in 2012, along with the Chatham Jail and the Toronto West Detention Centre.

See also 
List of correctional facilities in Ontario

References

Defunct prisons in Ontario
Buildings and structures in Brantford
2017 disestablishments in Ontario